Orešje Okićko is a settlement in the Jastrebarsko administrative area of Zagreb County, Croatia. As of 2011 it had a population of 16 people.

References

Populated places in Zagreb County